The Ranquil Formation is a Miocene and Pliocene sedimentary formation located in Arauco Province in south–central Chile, including outcrops in Mocha Island. The formation has its greatest thicknesses in the south-west, where its sediments were largely deposited in marine conditions. It overlies unconformably sedimentary formations of the Paleocene-Eocene Lebu Group. The formation is part of the fill of Arauco Basin which is a sedimentary basin that extends south of Concepción.

Macrofossils of the formation are similar to those of Navidad (34° S) and Lacui Formations (43° S), two nearby Miocene marine formations.

The base of the Ranquil Formation is the so-called "main unconformity", which is thought to have been formed by erosion during a period of tectonic inversion.

The formation was first defined in 1942 by Juan Tavera.

Units 
The formation has been subdivided into five units, with the lowermost being made up of sandstone and shale, and the second lowest one being made up of a conglomerate. The middle unit is made up of mudrock and massive sandstone. At some places the middle unit is overlain by a unit made up of sandstone with thin layers of conglomerate and sandstone that has been bioturbated. The uppermost unit include a breccia and the so-called Huenteguapi sandstone. The sediments of Huenteguapi sandstone evidences that a megatsunami struck the coast of south–central Chile in the Pliocene, which has been linked to the hypothetical Eltanin impact.

Fossil content 
The Ranquil Formation contains the following trace fossils: Zoophycos, Chondrites, Phycosiphon, Nereites missouriensis, Lockeiasiliquaria, Parataenidium, Ophiomorpha, Rhizocorallium and possibly also Psammichnites.

See also

References 

Geologic formations of Chile
Miocene Series of South America
Pliocene Series of South America
Neogene Chile
Conglomerate formations
Geology of Biobío Region
Coasts of Biobío Region